Unhooked Generation: The Complete Invictus Recordings is a collection of every single recording that Freda Payne had made for Invictus Records, including single versions of her hits "You Brought the Joy" and "Deeper and Deeper" and an alternate version of her biggest hit "Band of Gold." Like its predecessor Band of Gold: The Best of Freda Payne, it was released by a British distributor and then released in the US as an import. Inside the album cover is an essay on Payne's life and career by Peter Doggett, along with a transcript from a phoned interview of Payne by David Nathan (done in October 2001).

Track listing
Songs credited to "Edythe Wayne" and "Craighead" are in fact written by Brian Holland, Lamont Dozier and Eddie Holland (collectively known as Holland–Dozier–Holland),  the owners of Invictus Records who were in a legal dispute with their former employer Motown Records at the time, hence the pseudonyms.

Album credits
 Compiled and coordinated by: John Reed
 Remastered by: Nick Watson at SRT, St. Ives, Cambs
 Design and artwork by: Paul Bevoir for Love Melody
 Thanks to David Nathan and Freda Payne

References

2001 compilation albums
Freda Payne albums